Brigadier Frederick Maurice Watson Harvey, VC, MC (1 September 1888 – 24 August 1980) was an Irish-born Canadian recipient of the Victoria Cross, Canadian soldier and rugby union player. During the First World War, while serving in the Canadian Expeditionary Force, he was awarded the Victoria Cross, the Military Cross and the French Croix de Guerre.

Military career
Educated at Portora Royal School and Ellesmere College, Harvey first arrived in Canada in 1908 where he worked as a surveyor in northern Alberta and High River. On 18 May 1916 he enlisted in the 13th Regiment, Canadian Mounted Rifles, at Medicine Hat, Alberta. He was subsequently commissioned as a lieutenant and posted to the Western Front in 1916.  He then transferred to Lord Strathcona's Horse, part of the Canadian Cavalry Brigade. Harvey was awarded the Victoria Cross following an incident on 27 March 1917 at the village of Guyencourt.

Harvey was originally awarded the Distinguished Service Order but this was later upgraded to a VC. In March 1918, Harvey was also awarded the Military Cross for the same action that earned Lieutenant Gordon Flowerdew the VC.

After the war Harvey remained with Lord Strathcona's Horse and was promoted to captain in 1923. He then served as the Instructor in Physical Training at the Royal Military College of Canada from 1923 to 1927. In 1938, he was promoted to lieutenant colonel and became the commanding officer of Lord Strathcona's Horse. In 1939, he was made a brigadier and commander of Military District 13.

Sporting career 
Harvey made two senior appearances for Ireland. He played in the 1907 Home Nations Championship against Wales at Cardiff Arms Park, losing 29–0. His teammates on the day included James Cecil Parke and Basil Maclear. He played for Ireland for the second and last time in the 1911 Five Nations Championship at the Mardyke, winning 25–5 against France.

Harvey played rugby for both Wanderers and Ireland. He is one of three Ireland rugby union internationals to have been awarded the Victoria Cross. The other two are Thomas Crean and Robert Johnston, who both served in the Second Boer War. Like Harvey, Crean and Johnston also played for Wanderers. His two brothers Arnold and Duncan were also notable sportsmen. Both also represented Ireland at rugby, while Arnold also represented Ireland at cricket and athletics.

Later years
Harvey retired in December 1945, but maintained an active interest in horses as a judge of hunter and jumper competitions. He also served as Honorary Colonel of Lord Strathcona's Horse from 1958 to 1966.

He died aged 91 years and was buried at Union Cemetery in Fort Macleod, Alberta.

In 2019 his story along with other Wanderers Victoria Cross recipients Robert Johnston VC and Thomas Crean VC was told in a documentary entitled "Mark Our Place" directed and Produced by Ashley Morrison.

References

External links 
Frederick Maurice Watson Harvey's digitized service file
Generals of World War II

1888 births
1980 deaths
Burials in Canada
Military personnel from County Meath
Canadian Militia officers
Canadian Army officers
People from County Meath
Canadian people of Anglo-Irish descent
Irish emigrants to Canada (before 1923)
Ireland international rugby union players
Wanderers F.C. (rugby union) players
Canadian World War I recipients of the Victoria Cross
Irish World War I recipients of the Victoria Cross
Canadian recipients of the Military Cross
Recipients of the Croix de Guerre 1914–1918 (France)
Commanders of the Order of the British Empire
People educated at Ellesmere College
Academic staff of the Royal Military College of Canada
Canadian Army personnel of World War II
People educated at Portora Royal School
Canadian Expeditionary Force officers
Lord Strathcona's Horse officers
Canadian military personnel of World War I
Lord Strathcona's Horse (Royal Canadians)
Rugby union players from County Meath